Let's Have a Baby may refer to:
Let's Have a Baby, a film by Charlie Cho
"Let's Have a Baby", an episode of the TV series Playing House, GLAAD Media Award for Outstanding Individual Episode
 "Let's Have a Baby", a song on the Prince album Emancipation